Vlado Komšić (born 11 October 1955) is a retired football defender who played for clubs in the Bosnia and Herzegovina.

Club career
Nicknamed Tašo, Komšić joined Yugoslav Second League side Željezničar in 1977 and established himself in the side under Ivica Osim. He scored 14 goals in 310 official games for the club. He started as a leftback, but got his recognition as a seasoned center-half.

References

External links

1955 births
Living people
People from Kiseljak
Croats of Bosnia and Herzegovina
Association football defenders
Yugoslav footballers
FK Željezničar Sarajevo players
NK Čelik Zenica players
Yugoslav Second League players
Yugoslav First League players